Jessie T. Usher Jr. (born February 29, 1992) is an American actor. Known for playing Lyle on the Cartoon Network series Level Up, Cam Calloway on the Starz television series Survivor's Remorse, and Reggie Franklin / A-Train in the Amazon Prime Video series The Boys. His film appearances include When the Game Stands Tall (2014), Teenage (2014), Independence Day: Resurgence (2016), Shaft (2019), and Smile (2022).

Early life and education
Usher was born the son of Jessie T. and Judith Usher in Silver Spring, Maryland. Usher showed an interest in acting at the age of five after his sister Jesstia booked a TV commercial. His first acting job was an Oscar Mayer commercial. In 2003, the family relocated to Los Angeles to help further Usher's career. He graduated from high school at the age of 15. Usher joined Alpha Gamma Sigma and studied culinary arts in community college.

Career
Usher's first professional acting job was in an episode of CBS's Without a Trace in 2005. In 2007, he appeared in an episode of the Disney Channel original series Hannah Montana. In 2011, Usher starred in the Cartoon Network television film Level Up. The film spawned a television series in which Usher would reprise his role as Lyle Hugginson which lasted two seasons. He later voiced American Boy in the 2013 documentary Teenage. In 2014, Usher appeared in the film When the Game Stands Tall. In March 2014, Usher was cast as the lead in Survivor's Remorse, executive produced by NBA superstar LeBron James. The series premiered in October 2014.

In 2016, Usher appeared in Independence Day: Resurgence. Later that year, Usher co-starred in the Christmas themed comedy-drama Almost Christmas opposite Danny Glover and Kimberly Elise. In 2019, Usher played the lead in a sequel to the 1971 film Shaft, starring as the son of Samuel L. Jackson's character from the 2000 film, and the grandson of the original Shaft, played by Richard Roundtree.

In January 2018, it was announced that Usher has been cast as A-Train in the Amazon Studios series The Boys, which is based on Garth Ennis and Darick Robertson comic book with the same name.

In April 2020, he starred with Camila Mendes in the Netflix film Dangerous Lies.

In September 2022, he appeared in the psychological horror film Smile.

Filmography

Film

Television

Online

References

External links
 

1992 births
21st-century American male actors
African-American male actors
American male film actors
American male television actors
Living people
Male actors from Maryland
21st-century African-American people